Russia was a hardy Australian bred Thoroughbred racehorse who won the 1946 Melbourne Cup and other staying races.

Breeding 
He was a chestnut stallion foaled in 1940 by the unplaced, but good sire, Excitement (IRE) from the unraced Lady March by the useful broodmare sire, Bonnement (GB). Lady March also had two sets of twins that died and Brazen March, a filly that did not race. Russia was bred at Trangie, New South Wales by  J. G. Leeds and trained throughout his career by Ted Hush. During Russia's racing career  Leeds gave Ted Hush a half share in Russia prior to his Melbourne Cup win.

Racing record 
A hardy competitor he competed for seven seasons over distances from 5 furlongs (1,000 metres) to 2¼ miles, starting 89 times for 22½ wins, which included victories in 19 principal races. Racing under weight for age (w.f.a.) conditions he won 12½ races and defeated Shannon and Flight when they were at the peak of their racing careers.

His biggest win was the 1946 VRC Melbourne Cup which he won by five lengths in a time of 3 minutes 21.25 seconds that equalled the then race record set by Wotan ten years earlier.

Russia won a further 10 races following his Melbourne Cup win. He won £39,273 during his racing career.

1946 racebook

Image gallery

Stud record 
Russia stood at stud in 1948 before he returned to racing in the autumn of 1949 for a short period. He was then sold to David J. Davis of Phar Lap fame, and is now living in America after the conclusion of his racing career. Russia did not sire any principal race winners in Australia but did produce three stakes winners in the US, Carolas ($42,610), Georgie ($21,505) and Noredski ($72,410).

References 

1940 racehorse births
Racehorses bred in Australia
Racehorses trained in Australia
Melbourne Cup winners
Thoroughbred family 1-i
Godolphin Arabian sire line